Garret Keizer (born 1953) is an American author, writer and essayist. He has written numerous critically acclaimed books including: Help: The Original Human Dilemma, The Enigma of Anger, and A Dresser of Sycamore Trees. He is also a regular contributor to Harper's Magazine. He has served as an Episcopal priest and a High School English teacher. He grew up in New Jersey and now lives with his family in northeastern Vermont.

Authored books
 The Unwanted Sound of Everything We Want: A Book About Noise
 The Enigma of Anger: Essays on a Sometimes Deadly Sin
 A Dresser of Sycamore Trees: The Finding of A Ministry
 Help: The Original Human Dilemma
 God of Beer
 No Place But Here: A Teacher's Vocation in a Rural Community
 Privacy, Picador, 2012
 Getting Schooled: The Reeducation of an American Teacher, Henry Holt, 2014

Selected articles
 Requiem for the Private Word - Harper's Magazine - August 2008
 Specific suggestion: General strike - Harper's Magazine - October 2007
 Left, Right and Wrong - Mother Jones -  March/April 2005
 Sound and Fury - Harper's Magazine -  March 2001
 Life Everlasting - Harper's Magazine - February 2005
 Loaded - Harper's Magazine'' - December 2006

References

External links
Garret Keizer’s official website
Harper's Magazine (2007)
Harper Collins (2007)
Amazon.com (2007)

Living people
Harper's Magazine people
Writers from New Jersey
1953 births